Pedro Miguel de Santana Lopes GCC (born 29 June 1956) is a Portuguese lawyer and politician, who is the current president of the Municipal Chamber of Figueira da Foz. He most notably served as prime minister of Portugal from 2004 to 2005.

Background and early life

Pedro Santana Lopes was born in Campo Grande, Lisbon, to Aníbal Luís Lopes (b. Lisbon, São Sebastião da Pedreira, 17 February 1933), a company administrator whose maternal grandfather's maternal grandfather was a relative of João Brandão, and wife (m. Lisbon, São Sebastião da Pedreira, 27 February 1954) Maria Ivone Risques Pereira de Santana (Lisbon, São Sebastião da Pedreira, 3 May 1931 – Lisbon, 23 March 1999), a half-great-great-great-niece of the 2nd Baron of Brissos.

He graduated as a Licentiate in law from the Faculty of Law of the University of Lisbon, where he was the leader of the Student Union, becoming a lawyer.

Political career

He joined the Social Democratic Party (PSD) in 1976. There he started his career as a deputy to the Assembly of the Republic.

In 1979, he became a legal advisor to Prime Minister Francisco Sá Carneiro, and has identified himself as a follower of his for all his political life.

In 1986, he became the assistant state secretary to Prime Minister Aníbal Cavaco Silva, an office he left the next year to lead to PSD list to the European Parliament, where he remained for two years of his five-year-term.

In 1990, Cavaco Silva appointed him to the government post of secretary of state for culture. He left the office in 1994, in disagreement with Cavaco, and returned to law practice. In the 1997 local elections, he ran successfully to become mayor of Figueira da Foz. He decided not to seek a second term there, and instead ran for mayor of Lisbon in the 2001 local elections, defeating the incumbent João Soares and becoming one of the biggest surprises of the electoral night.

Prime minister

When José Manuel Durão Barroso resigned in July 2004 to take up the presidency of the European Commission, Santana Lopes became the president of PSD. At the time, his party had a coalition government with the CDS - People's Party, which held a parliamentary majority, and therefore he was nominated prime minister of the XVI Constitutional Government. His term as mayor of Lisbon was automatically suspended, with his deputy Carmona Rodrigues taking over his duties.

The leadership of Santana Lopes was marked by a number of inherited economic and political problems. When his party took power, after the 2002 legislative elections, the country's economy was in a poor state, with a rising government-spending deficit, partially because of policies focused on public expenditure by the previous governments (led by António Guterres of the Socialist Party) and the early 2000s recession. According to the Economist Intelligence Unit, "Portugal became the first country to breach the EU's 'excessive deficit' rule with a budget deficit of 4.4% of GDP in 2001, well above the 3% of GDP ceiling set by the EU's Stability and Growth Pact." The situation inherited by Santana Lopes was a little better, as the previous government led by Barroso had been able to comply with European Union directives regarding the deficit by selling State assets.

Santana Lopes himself failed to gain a reputation as a competent prime minister. His unusual rise to power, as Barroso's successor rather than by election, contributed to these difficulties, despite his nomination being entirely constitutional.

The short career of Santana Lopes as prime minister began with some members of government being shuffled between departments on the same afternoon as the government was being inaugurated. His minister of defense Paulo Portas looked surprised during the ceremony when he was announced as the minister for national defense and sea affairs. Portas' look of surprise when the name of his office was announced was broadcast live on television.

Santana Lopes' period in office was also marked by chaos in the allocation of teachers to schools (more than a month after classes officially started, and resulting from alleged incompetence of the IT provider (designated during the previous Government); the problem was swiftly solved by another small provider), and by claims of pressure exerted on the press, including arranging for the replacement of the information director of the public television channel RTP, and pressing private television channel TVI to tone down the criticism of him by a political commentator, Marcelo Rebelo de Sousa, a former leader of his own party, who consequently left the channel.

The government of Santana Lopes received its death sentence on 30 November 2004 when President Jorge Sampaio, a member of the opposing party, announced that he was calling an early Parliament election for February 2005, from which a new government would be formed, after Henrique Chaves, a Santana Lopes loyalist, resigned after four days as minister for sport, claiming that Santana Lopes lacked "loyalty and truth".

Santana Lopes announced the resignation of the government on 11 December so that his Government would assume just a caretaker role until the election. He went on to be defeated in the 2005 legislative elections which was won by the Socialist Party led by José Sócrates. Santana resigned as party leader two days later, although he still briefly assumed the informal position of leader of the opposition, until the election of Luís Marques Mendes as new party leader.

Subsequent career and activities

Despite his defeat in the 2005 legislative elections, Santana Lopes retained his seat at the Assembly of the Republic. He would also resume his functions as mayor of Lisbon, which had been suspended since he took office as prime minister. However, he decided not to seek another term on the 2005 local elections, being succeeded by his deputy, Carmona Rodrigues, who had replaced him during his premiership. In October 2007, after the election of Luís Filipe Menezes as leader of the Social Democratic Party, he was invited to lead the PSD Parliamentary Group, a position he held until Menezes' resignation in June 2008.

On the 2009 local elections, Santana Lopes ran again for mayor of Lisbon, supported by his party and by the CDS - People's Party, the Earth Party and the People's Monarchist Party. This coalition was, however, unable to prevent the Socialist Party, led by António Costa, to achieve a big victory. Santana Lopes assumed the position of leader of the opposition in the municipality.

In September 2011, Santana Lopes was nominated by Prime Minister Pedro Passos Coelho to assume leadership of Santa Casa da Misericórdia de Lisboa, a charity that runs Portugal's national lottery. In March 2016, the new prime minister, António Costa, nominated Santana Lopes for a new term.

In October 2017, Santana Lopes announced the intention to run again for the leadership of the Social Democratic Party. He resigned leadership of Santa Casa da Misericórdia de Lisboa in order to do so, but was defeated by Rui Rio. After the internal election, both Rio and Santana tried to cooperate on several levels within the party, an effort which was not successful from Santana's point of view. He grew increasingly disgruntled with the course of action imposed by Rui Rio, and in June 2018 he announced he would be ending his 42 years of party membership and would seek to create a new political party.

Alliance (2018–2021)

On 18 August 2018, it was revealed the new party headed by Santana Lopes was to be called Alliance. The party underwent the legal registration process with the Constitutional Court and was officially registered on 23 October.

Immediately after the official registration, the party started working on the campaign for the 2019 European Parliament election. Santana Lopes had already said, even before the party was registered, that he would not be running in the election, and that its top candidate would be announced in the near future. On 2 December 2018, the party formally announced Paulo de Almeida Sande, a professor of European affairs and advisor of the President Marcelo Rebelo de Sousa, as its top candidate. While being generally considered to have a profound knowledge of European issues, Paulo Sande lacked recognition next to the general public, and relied heavily on Santana's personal popularity to engage with supporters and potential voters. In March 2019, Santana Lopes said that the party's objective would be to elect at least one MEP, with three being a good result. Paulo Sande fared well in the televised debates, but the party suffered a heavy blow to its campaign when, on 15 May 2019, both Santana and Sande suffered a car crash on the A1 motorway. The two were heading to a campaign rally in Cascais after an event in Coimbra when, between Soure and Pombal, Santana fell asleep and lost control of the vehicle, a Lexus rented in name of his law firm. The car started to slid slowly to the left, hit the central reservation barrier and then veered abruptly to the right, going out of the road and tumbling several times before coming to a standstill in an overturned position. No other vehicles were involved in the accident, but other drivers witnessed it and alerted the emergency services. Paulo Sande was able to get out of the wrecked car by his own means; he tried to release Santana but was unable to help him. He would only be removed from the wreckage by the emergency services, and was transported by helicopter to Coimbra hospital, to where Sande was also taken by ambulance. The accident was reported by several media outlets, which prompted Alliance to immediately suspend its campaign. Paulo Sande, who suffered only minor injuries, was discharged from the hospital a few hours later, while Santana Lopes spent the night in observation, being discharged on the next day after several exams revealed no significant lesions; he was, however, told by doctors to rest for some days in order to ensure a full recovery. This meant that, with little more than a week to election, Paulo Sande was largely left to campaign for himself, although Santana appeared on a video three days before the election to urge people to vote. The party obtained 1,86% of the vote and elected no MEPs.

Next on the schedule were the 2019 legislative elections. The party made a campaign of clear opposition to the incumbent government led by António Costa. Santana Lopes said that Alliance hoped to elect two to three MPs in Lisbon district, and eventually some more in Porto and Braga districts; he also stressed that his party would never support a government of the Socialist Party even in the event of a hung parliament. Santana's predictions for the election were based at the party's results in the European elections. During a campaign event in Lisbon, he told that Alliance obtained 3% in the district at the European elections, and that the same result would allow the party to elect two MPs in the legislatives. This line of thought proved to be flawed as the party performed considerably worse, obtaining only 0,77% of the vote on national level and electing no MPs. Even on Lisbon district, where is easier for a small party to elect a MP, the party scored 1,27% of the vote, considerably lower than the 3% anticipated by Santana. On the election night, he admitted for the first time that he could relinquish party leadership.

Without further national elections in the near future, and with all the objectives unachieved, Santana Lopes suspended his executive functions as Alliance's leader on 15 May 2020, and announced a period of reorganisation of the party. On 28 August 2020, it was announced that he would not seek re-election as party leader at the next congress, where he was succeeded by Paulo Bento. On 25 January 2021, Alliance announced that Santana Lopes had sent a request for his party membership to be terminated. He considered that Alliance could only have a future without him, citing the fact that many people still link him to the Social Democratic Party as the main reason.

Independent politician and return to Figueira da Foz

After Santana's announcement that he was leaving Alliance leadership, rumours started circulating that he could be preparing a return to the Social Democratic Party. In October 2020, at least one media outlet reported that its leader, Rui Rio, wanted Santana Lopes to be the party candidate for mayor of Sintra; in March 2021, it was reported that he had declined to be the party candidate for mayor of Torres Vedras. His return to the Social Democratic Party was ruled out when it became known, in late March 2021, that he would seek to create a citizen's group in order to run for mayor of Figueira da Foz, a position he held between 1998 and 2002. His candidacy, leading a list called Figueira The First, was confirmed in May and generated significant interest, with opinion polls giving him real chances of winning. The candidate of the Social Democratic Party, Pedro Machado, launched on 10 August a legal action to invalidate Santana's candidacy due to alleged irregularities in its submission, which was rejected by the local court three days later.

Figueira a Primeira would effectively become the winner, obtaining 40,39% and four councillors, against 38,39% for the Socialist Party, also with four councillors. The Social Democratic Party scored 10,83%, electing only one councillor. Under Portuguese law, the top candidate of the most voted list automatically becomes the mayor, but Santana will have to negotiate with other political groups in order to implement his agenda, since he didn't win a majority. He nevertheless considered the result "an extraordinary feat".

Outside politics

After resigning as secretary of state of culture, Santana Lopes successfully ran for president of Sporting CP. Despite being in office for less than a year, the club won the 1994–1995 Taça de Portugal in football under his leadership.

Electoral history

Municipal elections for Lisbon, 2001

 

Honours
  Grand-Cross of the National Order of the Southern Cross, Brazil (28 August 1991 and 31 December 2003)
  Grand-Cross of the Order of Ouissam Alaouite, Morocco (20 February 1995)
  Grand-Cross of the Order of Merit, Hungary (27 October 2002)
 Grand-Cross in Gold of the Order of Merit, Austria (11 November 2004)
  Grand-Cross of the Order of Christ, Portugal (19 January 2010)

Bibliography
 Co-author with José Manuel Durão Barroso: Sistema de Governo e Sistema Partidário, Livraria Bertrand, 1980
 Portugal e a Europa: Que Futuro?, 1989
 Os Sistemas de Governos Mistos e o actual Sistema Português, Difel Editorial, 2001
 Figueira, a Minha História'', 2005
 Palavras Escritas, Elo, 2005
 Percepções e Realidade, Alêtheia Editores, 2006
 A Cidade é de todos, Livros d'Hoje, 2009
 Pecado Original''', D. Quixote, 2013

Footnotes

1956 births
Living people
Members of the Assembly of the Republic (Portugal)
Mayors of Figueira da Foz
Mayors of Lisbon
Prime Ministers of Portugal
Portuguese Roman Catholics
Portuguese football chairmen and investors
Social Democratic Party (Portugal) politicians
Sporting CP presidents
University of Lisbon alumni
20th-century Portuguese lawyers